The TQ-Mi is an obsolete circular Czechoslovakian anti-tank blast mine. The mines body is made of cardboard impregnated with asphalt. A central pressure cap is made of glass, which sits on top of a chemical fuze, which is crushed open onto the booster charge. The booster charge is embedded in the TNT main charge, above which are a number of scrap metal fragments, giving a secondary anti-personnel effect. 

It has now been withdrawn from service with the Czech and Slovakian armies.

Specifications
 Diameter: 560 mm
 Height: 150 mm
 Weight: 10 kg
 Explosive content: 5.21 kg of TNT with a 0.1 kg booster charge
 Operating pressure: 320 kg

References
 Jane's Mines and Mine Clearance 2005-2006
 

Anti-tank mines
Land mines of Czechoslovakia